The 1978 Individual Speedway World Championship was the 33rd edition of the official World Championship to determine the world champion rider.

Ole Olsen won his third world crown. The final was sponsored by the Sunday Mirror and was attended by 86,500. Gordon Kennett took silver on the day of his 25th birthday and American Scott Autrey won the bronze medal run-off defeating Dave Jessup and Jerzy Rembas. Dave Jessup was effectively denied a World title when after leading in heat 3 he suffered a bike malfunction and finished last in the heat. He then scored 11 points from his remaining rides which would have been enough to take the crown if he had won heat 3.

British Qualification

The British qualifying rounds for the World Championship doubled up as qualifying rounds for the Volkswagen/Daily Mirror Grand Prix. Therefore, many non-British riders such as Ivan Mauger and Phil Crump rode in these meetings scoring points towards the Volkswagen/Daily Mirror Grand Prix qualification - but their scores didn't count towards World Championship qualification.

British Final
August 16, 1978
 Coventry, Brandon Stadium
 First 4 to World Final

Swedish Qualification

Swedish Final
May 30, 1978
 Kumla
First 7 to Nordic Final + 1 reserve

New Zealand Final
 February 11, 1978
  Wellington
 Marked in green, to Austral-Asian Final

Intercontinental Round

Australasian Final
 February 12, 1978
  Auckland
 First 4 to Intercontinental Final

Danish Final
 May 15, 1978
 Fjelsted
 First 2 to Nordic Final

Nordic Final
 June 8, 1978
  Norrköping
 First 9 to Intercontnental Final

Intercontinental Final
 July 2, 1978
  Fredericia
 First 7 to World Final + 1 reserve

Continental Round

Continental Final
 July 2, 1978
 Prague
First 6 to World Final plus 1 reserve

World Final
2 September 1978
 London, Wembley Stadium

References

1978
World Individual
Individual Speedway World Championship
Individual Speedway World Championship
Speedway competitions in the United Kingdom